Baccarat is a card game. 

Baccarat may also refer to:

 Canton of Baccarat, Meurthe-et-Moselle department, France
 Baccarat, Meurthe-et-Moselle, a commune and seat of the canton
 Baccarat (company), manufacturer of crystal based in the commune
 Baccarat Hotels and Resorts company, owned by Starwood Capital Group
 Baccarat (film), a 1919 German silent drama film

See also
 Baccara, Spanish disco duo